Events from the year 1798 in Denmark.

Incumbents
 Monarch – Christian VII
 Prime minister – Christian Günther von Bernstorff

Events
 9 May  The County of Vrahesminde is established by Preben Bille-Brahe from the manors of af Hvedholm, Damsbo, Stensgård and  Østrupgård.
 20 June – The abolishment of the Stavnsbånd, a serfdom-like institution originally introduced in 1733. The implementation was gradual.

Undated

Births
 4 June – Niels Laurits Høyen, art historian (Denmark's first) and critic (died 1870)
 19 July – Christian August, future Duke of Schleswig-Holstein-Sonderburg-Augustenburg (died 1869)
 11 October – Thomas Overskou, actor, playwright and historian (died 1873)
 13 October – Herman Wilhelm Bissen, sculptor (died 1868)
 18 December – Emil Normann, painter (died 1881)

Deaths
 7 September – Peter Frederik Suhm, historian (born 1728)
 20 December – Johan Zoëga, entomologist and botanist (born 1742)

References

 
1790s in Denmark
Denmark
Years of the 18th century in Denmark